Art Frahm (1907–1981) was an American painter of campy pin-up girls and advertising. Frahm lived in Chicago, and was active from the 1940s to 1960s. He was commercially successful.

Frahm (not to be confused with Calen Frahm) had adequate technical competence for his medium, with a style somewhat reminiscent of Norman Rockwell's, though more cartoony. He was mostly influenced by commercial artist Haddon Sundblom, with whom Frahm may have worked as an assistant early in his career.  Frahm's forte was depicting beautiful young white women, taking in rendering their legs and figures. Frahm's depictions of the women's faces are less successful, often tending towards plastic doll-like expressions. Minor problems with perspective and unrealistic depiction of subsidiary figures and objects are common in Frahm's work.  Some of his artistic touches were deliberately unrealistic and artistically daring—for instance, his coloring of a city street lemon-yellow in an otherwise realist painting.

Today, Frahm is best known for his "ladies in distress" pictures involving beautiful young women whose panties mysteriously fall to the ground in a variety of public situations, causing maximum embarrassment to his pin-up girls and often causing them to spill their bag of groceries. In one of Frahm's noted idiosyncratic touches, celery is often depicted.  The falling-panties art has a small cult following as mid-20th century kitsch, or even as fetish art.  The works have been described with irony by James Lileks and Frahm's art works are available on the Internet. The falling-panties paintings were imitated by other pin-up artists, such as Jay Scott Pike and Al Brulé.

In addition to pin-ups, Frahm created a series of humorous hobo-themed calendar illustrations. Another set of paintings celebrated traffic safety, complete with smiling, chubby crossing guards and schoolchildren (one such painting appears as a calendar print in the background of a bar scene in the movie Hud). His advertising art included works for Coca-Cola and Coppertone.

See also 
 Pin-up girl
 List of pin-up artists

References

Sources
 The Great American Pin-Up, by Charles G. Martignette and Louis K. Meisel, .

External links
 Art Frahm at "The Pin-Up Files"
 Art Frahm at Lileks.com

1907 births
1981 deaths
American erotic artists
American illustrators
Pin-up artists